Dennis Craig Jurgens (December 6, 1961 – April 11, 1965) was an American 3-year-old boy who was murdered in White Bear Lake, Minnesota in April 1965. Jurgens was the only fatal victim of Lois Jurgens, his adoptive mother and a prolific child abuser, who abused a total of six adopted children from 1960 to 1975. The trial of Lois Jurgens for the murder of 3-year-old Dennis made national headlines and was the top news story of the state of Minnesota in 1987.  It is one of a few crimes that FBI agent Kenneth Lanning argues can legitimately be described as "ritual abuse".

Early history
Dennis Jurgens was born Dennis Craig Puckett in Sauk Centre, Minnesota. He was the son of teenage Jerry Sherwood (who was herself a ward of the state) and her teenage boyfriend. At the urging of authorities, Jerry placed Dennis for adoption after being told that he would receive good care.

Dennis was adopted by the Jurgens, of White Bear Lake, Minnesota, a suburb of Saint Paul: Harold Robert Jurgens, a former bandleader turned electrician, and Lois Germaine Josephine Zerwas Jurgens, a homemaker.  Lois had grown up in an impoverished family of sixteen siblings and used her marriage to the middle-class Harold Jurgens as a means to improve her social standing. She had a pathological need for control over her environment and obsessively cleaned and tended to her home and garden, desperate to appear the picture of the perfect housewife.      

In the decade preceding the adoption of Dennis, Lois Jurgens had suffered bouts of depression and psychosis, including an extended stay at a psychiatric institution where electroconvulsive therapy was administered. She was diagnosed as having mixed psychoneurosis and also unable to conceive a child with Harold. This drove Lois further into madness, as she felt she needed children to complete the "perfect picture" of her life.

Officially forbidden to adopt children owing to Lois' history of mental illness, the couple managed to adopt a baby named Robert privately. Robert fit in well at the Jurgens household, as he learned from a young age not to get in his mother's way or cause an undue mess that would likely send Lois Jurgens into a rage. The Jurgens' adoption of Robert seemed successful in the eyes of authorities, who began to consider the possibility that they might adopt more children through official channels.

Dennis arrives at the Jurgens home
Just past one year of age, Dennis was placed in the Jurgens' home in 1962, in anticipation of an adoption after spending much of his first year in foster care. There he had been loved and well cared for by an experienced foster mother. Almost immediately, Lois felt a severe, obsessive dislike of the child, who was a normal, rambunctious, and spirited toddler—unlike Robert, who in Lois' eyes, was the "good son." Harold Jurgens suggested that perhaps they should not go forward with the adoption of Dennis, but Lois refused out of concern that it would discourage the authorities from allowing them to adopt further children. Within months of Dennis' arrival, he was rushed to the hospital with first and second-degree burns on his genitalia, which were reported and accepted as accidental. The process of adopting Dennis was completed.

Abuse at the hands of Lois Jurgens
Lois Jurgens had a reputation amongst her extended family and neighbors as an intense, angry woman with a short and volatile temper, but Dennis' arrival in her home provoked sadistic rages that targeted Dennis as he aged from one to  years of age. Throughout the years of frequent abuse, it has been reported that while Harold Jurgens made little effort to curb his wife's abuse of young Dennis, he personally never mistreated the boy.

In her effort to make Dennis "right" in her eyes, Lois embarked on a series of sadistic and corporal punishments:

Angered at Dennis for rejecting certain foods, she responded by placing horseradish on the food and then force-fed it to him. According to reports from family members who eventually testified at the murder trial, Dennis turned purple from being force-fed the bitter and spicy horseradish and also having his oxygen supply cut off when Jurgens covered his mouth and nose. This treatment, along with the exertion as he struggled, sickened Dennis to the point of vomiting, which further enraged Jurgens, who then forced him to eat his vomit.

Lois obsessed about Dennis' weight, which according to medical records was appropriate for a child of his age and build at the point of his adoption. He was frequently starved, to rid him of "sloppy fat," as Lois called it (she also called him "Sloppy Fat" as a nickname). Due to this frequent starvation, Dennis gained only three pounds in a -year period as he aged from one year old to  years old. The coroner noted in his report that Dennis had almost zero subcutaneous fat, at the level of a person who had died of starvation.

Aside from the incident when Dennis was hospitalized with burns on his genitals, there were many other incidents of abuse that fell under the category of sexual sadism. Lois' remedy for the toddler wetting his diaper too frequently was to place a spring-action clothespin upon the end of his penis. The coroner noted there was evidence of adult human bite marks on his penis, and scarring all over his scrotum; he was also found to be wearing two diapers and a pair of rubber pants at the age of  years.

Testimony from neighbors and family members told of young Dennis showing up to public events wearing sunglasses at the age of two to hide his frequent black eyes. In addition, Lois took to tying Dennis' limbs to the bedposts to keep him in bed, and tied him to the toilet to force a bowel movement.

By all accounts, Lois was obsessed with abusing Dennis, and she wanted the world to know he was a "bad child"; she made no apologies about the inappropriate way she was disciplining him. Lois considered herself a devout Catholic and believed she was doing "God's work" by making Dennis "perfect" in her eyes. To this end, she forced religious training on her young sons; reports had young Robert flawlessly reciting the Rosary at two. Dennis struggled with such training and was forced to pray and recite his Rosary kneeling on a broomstick for extended periods, until he did it correctly.

To the casual observer, the Jurgens seemed to be a normal, church-going family with a perfectly maintained house and yard. Certain neighbors and family members knew there were problems with Lois' treatment of Dennis but did nothing to prevent it. They attempted to mind their own business and feared retribution from Lois, who was not above threatening the lives of her family members. In the 1960s, the term child abuse had not yet been coined and no one, not even medical professionals and teachers, was required to report suspicions.

Murder

During the early morning hours of April 11, 1965, Dennis Jurgens died at the hands of Lois Jurgens. The official cause of death was peritonitis due to perforation of the small bowel.  It is not known specifically what caused the fatal blow, though the injury was later found to have been, beyond a reasonable doubt, inflicted by Lois Jurgens owing to evidence of her constant physical abuse. Along with the aforementioned evidence of starvation and the scarring and bite-marks on his genitalia, the coroner discovered multiple lacerations and multiple generations of bruises covering most of his body.

The night of his death, a great flood had hit the Saint Paul area and the Mississippi River's waters were rising to record levels, causing flooding in the region and inside the Jurgens' home. Lois, who abused Dennis constantly, escalated to new levels of rage as the flood waters filled her basement.

The only witness to Lois's final abuse of Dennis was Robert, who was 5 years old at the time. Many years later, at his mother's trial, by then 27-year-old Robert recounted the events of that evening, testifying that his mother had beaten Dennis extensively and had thrown him down the stairs.

After the murder
Though there was an investigation, society and law enforcement of the mid-1960s did not accept the concept that a child in a middle-class home could be the target of abuse. It would have been difficult at the time to prove that Lois Jurgens had committed murder. In spite of extensive physical evidence pointing towards severe abuse, the medical examiner did not classify the death under any of the standard classifications of accident, suicide or murder; he simply marked it "deferred".

There was also a great deal of suspicion surrounding Jerome Zerwas, the brother of Lois Jurgens, who was a police lieutenant in the city of White Bear Lake, Minnesota. A common belief amongst witnesses and neighbors at the time of the murder, and among the investigators who eventually re-opened the case, is that he interfered with the investigation and destroyed incriminating evidence.

Although Lois was not charged with Dennis's murder, the death caused sufficient suspicion for the authorities to remove Robert from the home; he was placed with various relatives and one foster family for a period of just over five years, during which the Jurgens spent a great deal of effort and money attempting to regain custody. Initial placement was with a licensed, unrelated foster family, but Robert was then moved to his paternal grandparents at his parents' request. Placement with the paternal grandparents ended due to a house fire that occurred at a time when Robert was hospitalized with pneumonia, and his grandmother burned to death.  There is some suspicion that Lois Jurgens herself set the fire, given that it occurred while Robert was hospitalized, and that Lois had been known to threaten burning down the homes of several neighbors and family members who had spoken to authorities. Robert lived with other relatives, ultimately settling for two years with a distant cousin before he returned home.

Robert was returned to the Jurgens home and, going through new channels, the couple was eventually able to adopt four school-aged siblings from Kentucky. By this point, Lois' rage and mania had gone beyond her ability to maintain an appearance of normalcy, and she and Harold had relocated to rural Stillwater, Minnesota, possibly to escape the gossip of their former neighborhood where Dennis was killed.

As the new adopted children were older, there were many first-hand histories (recounted to the media during the 1987 trial of Lois Jurgens) describing the severe abuse they suffered at their adoptive mother's hands. Beatings and displays of Lois' explosive temper were daily events; especially bad days could include her slamming a child's forehead into a nail protruding from a wall, forcing a child to stand barefoot in snow, and shoving a used sanitary napkin in a child's face. During this period, Lois was once again placed in a psychiatric facility.

Eventually, all four of the siblings from Kentucky and Robert escaped the home by running away and getting help from concerned neighbors.  Their flight, coupled with the lingering suspicions surrounding Dennis' death, resulted in the termination of Lois and Harold Jurgens' parental rights.  They were informed they would not be allowed to foster or adopt any additional children.

Investigation
 By then in her late thirties, Dennis's birth mother Jerry Sherwood sought out Dennis in the early 1980s, assuming that he would be a young adult and—as she had given birth to four more children with Dennis's birth father—might want to meet his siblings. Her search led her eventually to his grave, and her continued investigation led to a phone call to Lois Jurgens to inquire about what had happened.  Lois was cordial on the phone, and even offered to mail some mementos. When these mementos failed to arrive, Sherwood called again, only to discover that the Jurgens had switched to an unlisted telephone number, further fueling her suspicions.

Sherwood eventually located Dennis's death certificate; because the death was categorized as "deferred", the case was still technically open. This, coupled with the lack of a statute of limitations for a murder charge, could lead the way to a prosecution of Lois Jurgens. Jerry took her case to the White Bear Lake police department and then to the local media.

Murder conviction and sentence
The St. Paul Pioneer Press ran a cover story about the investigation on Sunday, October 12, 1986.  Though the name of the adoptive family was not given, many suspected that the story was about Lois Jurgens. Sherwood's tenacity, along with the tragedy of her personal loss, kept the story in the public eye. Eventually Lois Jurgens was arraigned, and her identity released by the media.

Jurgens' other adopted son, Robert, testified at the trial, at which Lois Jurgens (then in her 60s) was convicted of third-degree murder and sentenced to prison.

The investigation, trial, and conviction are considered landmarks in the history of child abuse law.

Aftermath
Lois Jurgens served only eight years of her sentence, released early for good behavior, and lived a secluded life in Stillwater, Minnesota, until her death in 2013. She always proclaimed her innocence. Harold Jurgens died in 2000; at the time of his death, there was suspicion that Lois had poisoned him, but this was investigated and ruled out.

A Death in White Bear Lake is a true crime book by journalist Barry Siegel, published in 1990, which recounts the murder of Dennis Jurgens.

In popular culture 
 Barry Siegel's true crime book A Death in White Bear Lake details the murder of Dennis Jurgens.
 The 1992 NBC television film A Child Lost Forever told the story from the perspective of Jerry Sherwood (played by Beverly D'Angelo).
 A play, The Jurgens File, by Brian Vinero, examined the story from the perspective of the community.

See also
 List of murdered American children
 Lois Jurgens
 Child abuse
 A Death in White Bear Lake

References

Bibliography
 A Death in White Bear Lake by Barry Siegel.  Published by Bantam Books, 1990.
 Star Tribune article "Jurgens Seeks Seclusion After Release From Prison," published June 7, 1995, Metro Section Page 1B.
 Various other articles from the Star Tribune running between May and June 1987, including "Jurgens Found Sane, Sent to Prison," "Brother Tells of Dennis Jurgens' Beatings," "Jurgens Trial Inspires Birth Mother's Mission" and "Jurgens Relatives Testify She Abused Adopted Son"
 Twin Cities Magazine article "A Mother's Love, Jerry Sherwood in Her Own Words" February 1988 edition.
 Los Angeles Times article "Child Murder:  A Town Confronts Its Past," part of a series entitled "Death of a Child, Justice Delayed" by Barry Siegel.
 60 Minutes piece "No One Saved Dennis" reported by Diane Sawyer, 1988.

External links
 Child Murder: The town that lived in silence
 

1961 births
1965 deaths
1965 in Minnesota
1965 murders in the United States
April 1965 events in the United States
Child abuse resulting in death
Deaths by beating in the United States
Deaths by person in Minnesota
Deaths from peritonitis
Filicides in the United States
Incidents of violence against boys
Murdered American children
People from White Bear Lake, Minnesota
People murdered in Minnesota
Violence against men in North America